"WickedSkengMan 4" is a song by English rapper Stormzy. It was released as a single independently on 11 September 2015. The song peaked at number 18 on the UK Singles Chart.

Music video
A music video to accompany the release of "WickedSkengMan 4" was first released onto YouTube on 10 September 2015.

Charts

Release history

References

2015 songs
2015 singles
Stormzy songs